The Kakwa River is a tributary of the Smoky River in western Alberta, Canada.

The river is named for Kakwa, the Cree word for porcupine. Porcupines are abundant in Kakwa Provincial Park and Protected Area.

Tourism along the river revolves around bull trout fishing and white water rafting. The area was designated a protected wildland (Kakwa Wildland Park).

Course
The surrounding area is protected by Kakwa Provincial Park and Protected Area. The river flows north-east into the province of Alberta in Kakwa Wildlands Park, then flows east and north-east through the foothills.

Tributaries
From its origins to its mouth, Kakwa River receives waters from:
Kakwa Lake
Cecilia Creek
Mouse Cache Creek
Musreau Creek
Francis Peak Creek
South Kakwa River
Lynx Creek
Ravine Creek
Chicken Creek
Daniel Creek
Copton Creek
Redrock Creek
Route Creek
Prairie Creek

See also
List of rivers of Alberta

References

Rivers of Alberta
Rivers of British Columbia
Rivers of the Canadian Rockies